Snyder's of Hanover is an American bakery and pretzel brand distribution company based in Hanover, Pennsylvania, specializing in German traditional pretzels. Its products are sold throughout the United States, Canada, many European nations, Asia, and in the Middle East.

Corporate history
Snyder's of Hanover traces its roots to a bakery formed in Hanover, Pennsylvania, by Harry Warehime in 1909. In 1920 Eda and Edward Snyder started selling their homemade fried potato chips at various businesses.
In 1950, the company was split into two independent companies:  Snyder's of Hanover and Snyder of Berlin.  The Hanover Canning Company (later called Hanover Brands, and now Hanover Foods) purchased Snyder's of Hanover. Snyder's of Hanover was again spun off as an independent company in 1981. Snyder's of Hanover is no longer associated with Snyder of Berlin, something that is indicated on packages of Snyder's of Hanover.

In December 2007, Snyder's of Hanover acquired Jays Foods of Chicago, Illinois, after they declared bankruptcy. Snyder's plans to continue making and distributing Jays' full line of snacks throughout the midwest market.

In 2010, a plan to merge with rival Utz Quality Foods was blocked by the U.S. Federal Trade Commission. On July 22, 2010, it was announced that Snyder's of Hanover would be merging with Lance Inc. to create one of the largest snack food companies in the nation. The merged company became Snyder's-Lance, to be based in Charlotte, NC.

See also
 List of brand name snack foods

References

External links 

 

Brand name snack foods
Companies based in York County, Pennsylvania
Hanover, Pennsylvania
Brand name potato chips and crisps
Snyder's-Lance Inc. brands
Pretzels
American companies established in 1909
1909 establishments in Pennsylvania
Food and drink companies established in 1909
Snack food manufacturers of Pennsylvania